Hoo Junction is a rail yard on the North Kent Line, near the village of Higham, Kent and Shorne Marshes, operated by DB Schenker. It is between Gravesend and Higham stations, at the junction with the freight-only single-track Hoo branch to the Hoo Peninsula.

Layout
There are up and down yards on either side of the main line, with the single-track Grain branch line entering from the north east.

The up yard (south of the main line) consists of 14 sidings and three through roads, with other ancillary sidings. The down yard (north of the main line) consists of 10 sidings and three through roads. Some sidings in the down yard have been taken up.

As part of Phase 1 of the Kent Coast Electrification Scheme, the yard at Hoo Junction had a simple overhead catenary system installed in 1959, to accommodate the Class 71 electric locomotives then brought into use. These were equipped with a pantograph to work off the catenary, intended to avoid the exposed third rail which could have added a danger for yard staff. Due to introduction of diesel-electric locomotives the catenary system had become redundant by 1975.

Westinghouse Rail Systems has buildings adjacent to the north perimeter of the yard.

Traffic
The yard re-marshals wagon traffic on the main line and from the branch. The majority of traffic is aggregate wagons, with steel strip carriers are also present. Infrastructure units and ballast trains also use the yard. Container traffic from Thamesport used to pass through but this flow ceased around 2014 when the larger container shipping lines started using Thames Gateway instead of Thamesport.

Staff halt
Hoo Junction Staff Halt opened in 1956 in the yard, which it was built to serve. The down platform is on the main line before the junction with the branch, at TQ 6950 7369 , while the up platform is only on the main line, at TQ 6980 7364 . This station had an hourly service, which was advertised as being "for staff purposes only"

Down platform

Up platform

See also
 Rail transport in Great Britain

References

External links
 Sketch  of Hoo Junction track plan
 Kent Rail website detailing the operations of Hoo Junction
 Kent Rail detailing the staff halt
 Subterranea Britannica

Rail yards in the United Kingdom
Disused railway stations in Kent
Railway stations in Great Britain opened in 1956
Railway stations opened by British Rail
Private railway stations
Railway sidings in England